Friesodielsia hainanensis, synonym Richella hainanensis, is a species of plant in the Annonaceae family, native to Hainan. It was first described in 1964. In 2004, it was assessed as "vulnerable"; in 2022, it was listed by Plants of the World Online as "extinct".

References

Annonaceae
Flora of Hainan
Plants described in 1964
Vulnerable plants
Taxonomy articles created by Polbot